The Cima Ciantiplagna is a mountain in the Cottian Alps belonging to the Province of Turin (Italy).

Geography 

The mountain stands on the long ridge which, starting from Sestriere, divides the Susa Valley from Chisone valley, W of the colle delle Finestre. Despite being shaped as an inconspicuous, grassy bump, it's the highest mountains of the area between Colle delle Finestre and Sestriere. Close to its summit passes an old military road built  in order to deserve several military emplacements. It's a dirt road connecting Pian dell'Alpe (Usseaux) with Sestriere, open to cars and motorbikes during summertime.

SOIUSA classification 
According to SOIUSA (International Standardized Mountain Subdivision of the Alps) the mountain can be classified in the following way:
 main part = Western Alps
 major sector = North Western Alps
 section = Cottian Alps
 subsection = Central Cottian Alps ( Alpi del Monginevro)
 supergroup = Catena Bucie-Grand Queyron-Orsiera
 group = Gruppo dell'Orsiera
 subgroup = Costiera Orsiera-Rocciavrè
 code = I/A-4.II-A.3.b

Access to the summit 

The summit of the Ciantiplagna is easy to reach, and the normal route starts from the old military road linking Sestriere with Colle delle Finestre and briefly follows the NE ridge of the mountain up to its top, marked by a metallic summit cross. It also can be attained by mountain bike. Besides summer hiking the Ciantiplagna is also a popular ski mountaineering destination.

Nature conservation 
The mountain and its surrounding area are included in a regional nature park called Parco naturale Orsiera - Rocciavrè, which also is the SIC (Site of Community Importance) of code IT1110006.

References

Maps
 Italian official cartography (Istituto Geografico Militare - IGM); on-line version: www.pcn.minambiente.it
 Istituto Geografico Centrale - Carta dei sentieri e dei rifugi scala 1:50.000 n. 1 Valli di Susa Chisone e Germanasca

External links 
 
 Cima Ciantiplagna: 360° panoramic image from the summit on pano.ica-net.it 

Two-thousanders of Italy
Mountains of Piedmont
Mountains of the Alps
Metropolitan City of Turin